The 1869–70 New South Wales colonial election was held between 3 December 1869 and 10 January 1870. This election was for all of the 72 seats in the New South Wales Legislative Assembly and it was conducted in 52 single-member constituencies, six 2-member constituencies and two 4-member constituencies, all with a first past the post system. Suffrage was limited to adult white males. The previous parliament of New South Wales was dissolved on 15 November 1869 by the Governor, Lord Belmore, on the advice of the Premier, John Robertson.

There was no recognisable party structure at this election; instead the government was determined by a loose, shifting factional system.

Key dates

Results
{{Australian elections/Title row
| table style = float:right;clear:right;margin-left:1em;
| title        = New South Wales colonial election, 3 December 1869 – 10 January 1870
| house        = Legislative Assembly
| series       = New South Wales colonial election
| back         = 1864–65
| forward      = 1872
| enrolled     = 124,433
| total_votes  = 87,137
| turnout %    = 53.70
| turnout chg  = +2.30
| informal     = 226
| informal %   = 0.41
| informal chg = +0.05
}}

|}

References

See also
 Members of the New South Wales Legislative Assembly, 1869–1872
 Candidates of the 1869–70 New South Wales colonial election

1869-70
1869 elections in Australia
1870 elections in Australia
1860s in New South Wales
December 1869 events
January 1870 events
1870s in New South Wales